George Shaw (born 10 February 1969) is a Scottish former football player who is currently manager of Cumbernauld United in the Scottish Junior Football Association, West Region. He played in the Scottish Football League Premier Division for four clubs.

Career
Shaw began his career with St Mirren but left the club in June 1991 for Partick Thistle when he and Mark McWalter were exchanged for Chic Charnley and David Elliot. He joined Dundee along with fellow Thistle player Gerry Britton in January 1994 for a combined fee of £250,000, but the club were relegated to the First Division at the end of the season. After three years in the second tier, which also included a Scottish League Cup final defeat to Aberdeen in 1995, Shaw returned to the Premier Division in 1997 with Dunfermline Athletic. He later had spells at Ross County, Partick Thistle for a second time, Clydebank, Stranraer, Forfar Athletic and Arbroath before dropping out of the Scottish Football League to play for Junior sides Shettleston and Cumbernauld United.

Shaw returned to Forfar Athletic under manager Ray Farningham, initially serving as his assistant before succeeding him in the role. The team struggled, ultimately finishing bottom of the Second Division although Shaw was sacked in March before the season had ended.

Shaw was playing for and managing amateur team Kilsyth United AFC, and also scouting opponents for Partick Thistle, before joining Craig Tully's management team at East Stirlingshire in the summer of 2014. With Tully sacked after Shire's relegation to the Lowland Football League in 2016, Shaw joined the coaching team at Cumbernauld United as assistant to John Queen that summer and following Queen's resignation in September, was appointed manager after a short interim period in charge.

References

External links

1969 births
Living people
Scottish footballers
St Mirren F.C. players
Partick Thistle F.C. players
Dundee F.C. players
Dunfermline Athletic F.C. players
Ross County F.C. players
Clydebank F.C. (1965) players
Stranraer F.C. players
Forfar Athletic F.C. players
Arbroath F.C. players
Glasgow United F.C. players
Scottish football managers
Forfar Athletic F.C. managers
Footballers from Glasgow
Scottish Football League players
Scottish Football League managers
Scottish Premier League players
Scottish Junior Football Association players
Association football forwards
Scottish Junior Football Association managers